On with the Show was a world tour by the rock group Fleetwood Mac. The tour began in Minneapolis, Minnesota on September 30, 2014 and concluded in Auckland, New Zealand on November 22, 2015. Tickets were available for pre-sale between March 31 to April 6, before going on sale to the general public on April 7, 2014. At the end of 2014, the tour placed 13th on Pollstar's "Top 100 Worldwide Tours", earning $74.1 million from 40 shows in North America. In 2015's year-end report, the tour placed 6th with a gross of $125.1 million from 78 shows, bringing the total gross so far to $199.2 million.  

Due to the departure of Lindsey Buckingham in 2018 and the death of Christine McVie in 2022, On with the Show would be Fleetwood Mac's final tour with the five members who recorded Rumours.

Background and development 
On January 13, 2014, the band's publicist Liz Rosenberg announced that Christine McVie, who had previously quit the band in 1998 after three decades, would be rejoining. Rosenberg additionally announced that a new album and tour would be forthcoming. The group spent time in March working on new music, until confirming they don't plan on releasing any new material until after the tour is finished. Tour dates were announced on March 27, 2014 and tickets went on sale to the public on April 7, 2014. On October 9, 2014 the band announced it would add a 2nd Leg with an additional 28 shows beginning on January 16, 2015 in St. Paul, Minnesota and ending March 31, 2015 in Wichita, Kansas. In November 2014 Mick Fleetwood went on BBC Radio 2 to announce that Fleetwood Mac would be touring through Britain in May and June 2015. However, due to high demand, more dates were added, which stretched the leg into July 2015. the Manchester Arena date on June 12, 2015 was canceled due to an illness within the band.

Set list 
This set list is representative of the performance on October 6, 2014. It does not represent all concerts for the duration of the tour.

"The Chain"
"You Make Loving Fun"
"Dreams"
"Second Hand News"
"Rhiannon"
"Everywhere"
"I Know I'm Not Wrong" or "Bleed to Love Her"
"Tusk"
"Sisters of the Moon" or "Sara"
"Say You Love Me"
"Seven Wonders" (Dropped from the set after the North American tour)
"Big Love"
"Landslide"
"Never Going Back Again"
"Over My Head" or "Think About Me"
"Gypsy"
"Little Lies"
"Gold Dust Woman"
"I'm So Afraid"
"Go Your Own Way"

Encore 1
"World Turning"
"Don't Stop"
"Silver Springs"

Encore 2
"Songbird" (Didn't perform in some shows in 2015)

Shows

Cancelled shows

Personnel
Lindsey Buckingham – lead guitar, vocals
Stevie Nicks – vocals
Christine McVie – vocals, keyboards, accordion on "Tusk"
John McVie – bass
Mick Fleetwood – drums, percussion

with:
Brett Tuggle – keyboards, rhythm guitar, samples, backing vocals
Neale Heywood – rhythm guitar, backing vocals
Sharon Celani – backing vocals
Steve Rinkovv – drums, percussion (unannounced from stage)
Lori Nicks – backing vocals
Stevvi Alexander – backing vocals

Notes

References

2014 concert tours
2015 concert tours
Fleetwood Mac concert tours